The Damansara–Shah Alam Elevated Expressway (DASH) E31 (or New North Klang Valley Expressway) is an expressway in Klang Valley, Selangor, Malaysia. Estimated cost of the expressway is MYR 11.5 billion.

Route background

The zeroth kilometer is located at the Puncak Perdana U10 Shah Alam intersection. It acts a link for Puncak Perdana, Alam Suria, Denai Alam, Kampung Melayu Subang, Jalan Sungai Buloh, RRIM, Kota Damansara, Damansara Perdana and Mutiara Damansara. The expressway ends at the Penchala interchange, linking it to the Damansara–Puchong and Sprint Expressways.

Interchanges include Puncak Perdana, Alam Suria, Denai Alam, Kampung Melayu Subang, Galaksi, Subang 2, LTSAAS, RRIM, Surian, Kenanga, Mutiara Damansara and Penchala.

History
The increasing development along the links of Shah Alam and Jalan Batu Arang (Persiaran Mokhtar Dahari) facilitated the need of increasing road capacity. So, Prolintas proposed that the expressway to be built to meet these requirements. It would not only serve as an alternative route for Persiaran Surian in Kota Damansara and to the Subang Airport, but also act as a link between east and west of Klang Valley, thus crossing over the New Klang Valley Expressway, and linking existing expressways such as the Guthrie Corridor Expressway, LDP and SPRINT. In addition, the expressway will solve congestion to the existing routes caused by the development at the Rubber Research Institute of Malaysia's land in the area.

PROLINTAS held the expressway's opening ceremony at Denai Alam toll plaza on 13 October 2022, and the expressway was opened to traffic on 14 October 2022, at 12:01 AM (MST). The toll were free of charge from the officially opened date until 30 November 2022 The project was allocated RM4.2 billion in the Budget 2015.

Incidents
19 June 2021 – While the expressway was under construction, a stop-work order had been issued immediately following an incident which occurred above the New Klang Valley Expressway's Kota Damansara Interchange 107. The incident involved a metal scaffolding that fell off a dozen-meter high pillar, injuring two Bangladeshi workers. The injured workers were rushed to Sungai Buloh Hospital for treatment, unfortunately one of them died on the following day. Since the crash occurred in a closed area, no motorist was injured.
20 October 2022 – A food delivery motorcyclist was killed after his motorcycle skidded and crashed at a highway divider through the full-enclosure noise barriers westbound from Penchala Interchange. The victim was taken to University Malaya Medical Centre for post-mortem.

Tolls
DASH adopts an open toll system.

Electronic Toll Collections (ETC)
As part of an initiative to facilitate faster transactions at the Kota Damansara, Kwasa Damansara and Denai Alam Toll Plazas, all toll transactions at these three toll plazas on DASH are conducted electronically via Touch 'n Go cards or SmartTAGs beginning 1 December 2022.

Toll rates
There are three toll plazas along DASH, namely, Denai Alam, RRIM (Kwasa Damansara) and Kota Damansara, each charging at the same rate.
 
(Starting 1 December 2022)

List of interchanges

Main Link

Kampung Melayu–Kota Damansara Link

External links
Damansara–Shah Alam Elevated Highway (DASH) website

Gallery

References

Expressways in Malaysia
Proposed roads in Malaysia